The 11th Pedro Sienna Awards were presented at the Municipal Theatre in Chillán on August 5, 2017 given by the National Council of Culture and the Arts (CNCA) to honour the best in Chilean films of 2017. Daniela Vega and Matías Assler hosted the ceremony.

The nominees were announced on July 19, 2017. Chameleon led the nominations with eleven including Best Film, Best Director, Best Actor, Best Actress twice, Best Supporting Actor and Best Screenplay, followed by Much Ado About Nothing with nine nominations.

Much Ado About Nothing won Best Film, as well as Best Screenplay. Rara won Best Film too. Neruda won the most awards with five. Jorge Riquelme won Best Director for Chameleon.

Winners and Nominees

Honorary Award

Jacqueline Mouesca

Films by number of nominations and awards

References

External links
Official site

Chilean film awards